Pleasant Green is a ghost town in Sumner Township, Phillips County, Kansas, United States.

History
Pleasant Green was issued a post office in 1877. The post office was discontinued in 1904.

References

Former populated places in Phillips County, Kansas
Former populated places in Kansas